OPSI may stand for:

Overwhelming post-splenectomy infection, rapidly fatal septicaemia in a patient who has undergone splenectomy (removal of the spleen).
Office of Public Sector Information, a UK government body incorporating Her Majesty's Stationery Office.
  Open PC Server Integration An open source systems management system with the emphasis on automating software deployment on Windows clients, based on a Linux server.